Mugkuchi is a census village in Nalbari district, Assam, India. As per the 2011 Census of India, Mugkuchi village has a total population of 2,423 people including 1,240 males and 1,183 females with a literacy rate of 80.07%.

Mugkuchi village is known for Jaapi artisans.

References 

Villages in Nalbari district